Pijnacker Centrum is a RandstadRail station located in Pijnacker, the Netherlands.

History
The railway station opened here on 1 October 1908 as part of the Hofpleinlijn. This station was closed on 3 June 2006 for conversion to a RandstadRail metro station.

The RandstadRail station opened on 10 September 2006 for the RET Erasmuslijn metro service, currently line E. The station features 2 platforms, that are the same height as the train doors.

In 2006 and 2007 the service was operated as a shuttle Rotterdam Hofplein - Nootdorp. The station lies in the centre of Pijnacker, near the Oostlaan.

Train services
The following services currently call at Pijnacker Centrum:

Bus service
These service departs from near the station, on the Oostlaan, one level higher than the station:

 455 (Zoetermeer Centrum West - Zoetermeer NS - Pijnacker Centrum - Delfgauw - Delft University - Delft NS) (operated by RNET)

Gallery

Railway stations opened in 1908
RandstadRail stations
Railway stations closed in 2006
1908 establishments in the Netherlands
Pijnacker-Nootdorp
Railway stations in the Netherlands opened in the 20th century